Sara Seager  (born 21 July 1971) is a Canadian-American astronomer and planetary scientist. She is a professor at the Massachusetts Institute of Technology and is known for her work on extrasolar planets and their atmospheres. She is the author of two textbooks on these topics, and has been recognized for her research by Popular Science, Discover Magazine, Nature, and TIME Magazine. Seager was awarded a MacArthur Fellowship in 2013 citing her theoretical work on detecting chemical signatures on exoplanet atmospheres and developing low-cost space observatories to observe planetary transits.

Background
Seager was born in Toronto, Ontario, Canada, and is Jewish. Her father, David Seager, who lost his hair when he was 19 years old, was a pioneer and one of the world's leaders in hair transplantation and the founder of the Seager Hair Transplant Center in Toronto.

She earned her BSc degree in Mathematics and Physics from the University of Toronto in 1994, assisted by a NSERC University Undergraduate Student Research Award, and a PhD in astronomy from Harvard University in 1999. Her doctoral thesis developed theoretical models of atmospheres on extrasolar planets and was supervised by Dimitar Sasselov.

She held a postdoctoral research fellow position at the Institute for Advanced Study between 1999 and 2002 and a senior research staff member at the Carnegie Institution of Washington until 2006. She joined the Massachusetts Institute of Technology in January 2007 as an associate professor in both physics and planetary science, was granted tenure in July 2007, and was elevated to full professor in July 2010. She currently holds the "Class of 1941" chair.

She was elected a Legacy Fellow of the American Astronomical Society in 2020.

She is married to Charles Darrow and they have two sons from her first marriage. Her first spouse, Michael Wevrick, died of cancer in 2011.

Academic research

Seager's research has been primarily directed toward the discovery and analysis of exoplanets; in particular her work is centered around ostensibly rare earth analogs, leading NASA to dub her "an astronomical Indiana Jones." Seager used the term "gas dwarf" for a high-mass super-Earth-type planet composed mainly of hydrogen and helium in an animation of one model of the exoplanet Gliese 581c. The term "gas dwarf" has also been used to refer to planets smaller than gas giants, with thick hydrogen and helium atmospheres. In years since 2020, Sara has been focusing on work related to Venus, with the potential discovery of phosphine, a biosignature gas, in the upper atmosphere.

Seager equation
Seager developed a parallel version of the Drake equation to estimate the number of habitable planets in the Galaxy. Instead of aliens with radio technology, Seager has revised the Drake equation to focus on simply the presence of any alien life detectable from Earth. The equation focuses on the search for planets with biosignature gases, gases produced by life that can accumulate in a planet atmosphere to levels that can be detected with remote space telescopes.

 

where:
 N = the number of planets with detectable signs of life
 N* = the number of stars observed
 FQ = the fraction of stars that are quiet
 FHZ = the fraction of stars with rocky planets in the habitable zone
 FO = the fraction of stars with observable planets
 FL = the fraction of planets that have life
 FS = the fraction of life forms that produce planetary atmospheres with one or more detectable signature gases

Honors and awards 
Seager was awarded the 2012 Sackler Prize for "analysis of the atmospheres and internal compositions of extra-solar planets," the Helen B. Warner Prize from the American Astronomical Society in 2007 for developing "fundamental techniques for understanding, analyzing, and finding the atmospheres of extrasolar planets," and the 2004 Harvard Book Prize in Astronomy. She was appointed as a fellow to the American Association for the Advancement of Science in 2012 and elected to the Royal Astronomical Society of Canada as an honorary member in 2013. In September 2013 she became a MacArthur Fellow. She was elected to the American Philosophical Society in 2018. She was the Elizabeth R. Laird Lecturer at Memorial University of Newfoundland in 2018. On 19 August 2020 Seager appeared on the Lex Fridman Podcast (#116).

In 2020, she was appointed as an Officer of the Order of Canada. She won the 2020 Los Angeles Times Book Science and Technology Prize for The Smallest Lights in the Universe.

Publications

Books

Journal articles

See also
List of women in leadership positions on astronomical instrumentation projects

References

External links
 MIT Home page 
 Thirteen.org
 

1971 births
Living people
Canadian academics
American women astronomers
21st-century Canadian astronomers
Harvard Graduate School of Arts and Sciences alumni
Canadian emigrants to the United States
Massachusetts Institute of Technology School of Science faculty
Scientists from Toronto
Writers from Toronto
Women planetary scientists
Planetary scientists
University of Toronto alumni
MacArthur Fellows
Astrobiologists
Canadian women biologists
Jewish Canadian scientists
Fellows of the American Astronomical Society
Officers of the Order of Canada
People from Concord, Massachusetts
21st-century Canadian women scientists
21st-century Canadian biologists